Christopher Keith Doig  (4 April 1948 – 13 October 2011) was a New Zealand opera singer and sports administrator. In 1972 he won New Zealand's Mobil Song Quest and studied at the Vienna Music Academy before becoming principal tenor at the Vienna State Opera. After ten years in Austria, Doig returned to New Zealand, where he was appointed chief executive of New Zealand Cricket and was a member of the New Zealand Rugby Union board. 

In 1990, Doig was the artistic director of the New Zealand Festival of the Arts. He staged Wagner's Die meistersinger von Nürnberg, starring Donald McIntyre.

Awards 
In 1990, Doig was awarded the New Zealand 1990 Commemoration Medal. He was appointed an Officer of the Order of the British Empire, for services to the arts, in the 1992 Queen's Birthday Honours, and in the 2011 Queen's Birthday Honours he was made a Companion of the New Zealand Order of Merit, for services to the arts and sport.

Family 
Christopher Doig had four children: Rachel Marie, Christopher Paul (Paul) and Brendon Matthew with his first wife Robyn Jane (Jane) Doig and one child Lucas James (Luke) with his second wife Suzanne Mary Prain. At the time of his death he had 10 grandchildren. He also had three brothers an older brother John Doig and two younger brothers Quentin and Hamish Doig. His parents names were Roger and Ngarie. 

Doig died on 13 October 2011 after a two-year battle with bowel cancer, aged 63.

References

1948 births
2011 deaths
Companions of the New Zealand Order of Merit
New Zealand cricket administrators
New Zealand operatic tenors
New Zealand Officers of the Order of the British Empire
Sportspeople from Christchurch
Deaths from colorectal cancer
Deaths from cancer in New Zealand
Musicians from Christchurch